Edward Owens may refer to:

Edward William James Owens (1860–1928), Canadian lawyer and politician
Edward Owens (filmmaker) (1949–2009), African-American filmmaker and director
Eddie Owens (born 1953), American basketball player
Ed Owens, American swimmer, see Swimming at the 1964 Summer Paralympics
Edward Owens (hoax), a fictional character, part of a hoax created in 2008

See also
Ted Owens (disambiguation)
Edward Owen (disambiguation)